Water crystal gel or water beads or gel beads is any gel which absorbs and contains a large amount of water.  Water gel is usually in spherical form and composed of a water-absorbing superabsorbent polymer (SAP, also known as slush powder in dry form) such as a polyacrylamide (frequently sodium polyacrylate).

Uses
Water gels are used for:

 Supplying water to small animals as an alternative to supplying water in a dish. Some small animals tend to fall into dishes of water and drown.
 Watering or potting plants.
 In vases of cut flowers 
 Use in gardens to save water.
 Used as ammunition for gel blaster toy guns. Usually came in 7-8mm when full size.
 Colorful decorations or artificial snow.
 In a dry state as absorbent filler inside disposable diapers and sanitary napkins.
 Proposed for controlling or containing floods.

See also
 Superabsorbent polymer (further uses, chemical and physical details)
 Polyacrylamide (more uses and details)
 Orbeez (a commercial toy utilizing this technology)

References

Gels
Water chemistry